The men's 1500 meter at the 2019 KNSB Dutch Single Distance Championships in Heerenveen took place at the Thialf ice skating rink on Saturday 29 December 2018. There were 20 participants.

Statistics

Result

Source:

 Referee: D. Melis  Starter: J. Rosing
 Start: 14:31 hr. Finish: 16:03 hr.

Draw

References

Single Distance Championships
2019 Single Distance